This is a list of former CBUT-TV transmitters that were used by the Canadian Broadcasting Corporation to expand the coverage area of a station to include remote rural areas throughout the Canadian province of British Columbia. These transmitters served as rebroadcasters of CBUT's main signal that originates from Vancouver. Due to budget cuts, the CBC decommissioned these transmitters, along with its other 600+ over-the-air analogue television transmission network on July 31, 2012.

Unless otherwise specified, these transmitters have all gone off the air on July 31, 2012.

Former rebroadcasters

CBUT Vancouver

CBUAT

CBUBT

CBUCT

CBUHT

CBUIT

CBCB-TV

CBCD-TV

CBCY-TV

Other CBUT satellites in British Columbia

CBUT programming on CBC North stations 
From 1973 on, through the facilities of the Anik Telecommunications Satellite, these transmitters in the Northwest Territories, along with the repeaters of CFYK-TV/Yellowknife, Northwest Territories, and the now-defunct CFWH-TV/Whitehorse, Yukon and CHAK-TV in Inuvik, Northwest Territories, aired some of CBUT's programming as part of the CBC North television service transmitters, originally known as the Frontier Package.

These rebrodcasters, and those of CFYK, CFWH and CHAK received the network feed from CBUT.

Additionally, prior to 1982, repeater stations CBKAT in Uranium City, Saskatchewan, and CHFC-TV in Churchill, Manitoba, aired some of CBUT's programs on their signals as they were originally part of CBC North. CHFC since became a repeater of CBWT/Winnipeg in 1980, while CBKAT became a repeater CBKST/Saskatoon in 1982.

See also
List of former rebroadcasters of CFWH-TV 
List of former rebroadcasters of CFYK-DT
List of defunct CBC and Radio-Canada television transmitters

References

External links
CBC Vancouver

Defunct television stations in Canada
2012 disestablishments in British Columbia
Television stations in British Columbia
Transmitter sites in Canada
CBC Television stations